Karolína Peake (born 10 October 1975), née Kvačková, is a Czech politician and lawyer who served as the Deputy Prime Minister of the Czech Republic from 2011 to 2013.

Career
She was a member of the Civic Democratic Party between 1997 and 1998, during her studies at university. In 1999 she graduated from the Faculty of Law at Charles University and married Charles Peake, an Australian manager of Czech-Chinese origin. After this, she worked as a trainee lawyer in the Czech branch of Baker & McKenzie. She gave birth to her sons Sebastian, and Theodor, with whom she took five years parental leave. Thereafter, she began to be involved in local politics, including campaigns to save a local park and to extend local children's playgrounds. In 2006, she was elected to the town council of Prague 1 for Public Affairs.

Peake was elected to the Chamber of Deputies in the 2010 election, representing Public Affairs (VV), but left in April 2012 with seven other MPs. The party she founded after breaking away from VV was named LIDEM, which means "for the people" in Czech, and is also based on the first letters of "Liberal Democrats". She was appointed Minister of Defense in December 2012, but was dismissed by Prime Minister Petr Nečas eight days later, due to criticism of her rapid replacement of ministry deputies.

Peake is a member of the Prague Society for International Cooperation, an NGO which aims to create connections between future leaders and public figures.

See also
 Petr Nečas's Cabinet

References 

Defence ministers of the Czech Republic
Independent politicians in the Czech Republic
Public Affairs (political party) politicians
Civic Democratic Party (Czech Republic) politicians
Charles University alumni
Politicians from Prague
1975 births
Living people
Czech city councillors
Female defence ministers
Women government ministers of the Czech Republic
Czech women lawyers
People associated with Baker McKenzie
Members of the Chamber of Deputies of the Czech Republic (2010–2013)
21st-century Czech women politicians
21st-century Czech lawyers